Angels Over Broadway (also called Before I Die) is  a 1940 American film noir drama film starring Douglas Fairbanks Jr., Rita Hayworth, Thomas Mitchell and John Qualen. Ben Hecht, who co-directed (with cinematographer Lee Garmes), co-produced and wrote the screenplay, was nominated for an Oscar for Best Original Screenplay.

Fairbanks Jr. co-produced, helping persuade Harry Cohn of Columbia to finance. Cohn gave them Rita Hayworth, in her first leading role in an "A" picture. "Cohn couldn't figure out what the picture was about but neither could we," said Fairbanks Jr.

Plot
Bill O'Brien is a New York con man in search of his next gullible victim. In a fancy nightclub, he finds Charles Engle, a guilt-ridden man on the brink of committing suicide after embezzling a large sum of money that he has spent on his high-maintenance wife. Charles seems like an unsophisticated out-of-towner visiting the city and Bill decides to try for his money. Bill is unaware that the desperate Charles only has until six am to pay back the money he has embezzled before the crime is discovered.

One of the showgirls at the club, Nina Barona, is persuaded by Bill to help trick Charles into entering a poker game to win back the money. The game is arranged by a gangster named Dutch Enright. Another disillusioned man at the club, playwright Gene Gibbons, learns about Charles's misfortune from the suicide note he discovers in his coat, and wants to write the man a story with a happier ending. He tries to get a valuable brooch from his ex-girlfriend, to give to Charles so that he can get the money, but his plan fails because the brooch is a cheap copy. Instead he overhears Bill telling of his poker scam against Charles, and persuades Bill to change the plan so that Charles wins the first rounds and is allowed to escape from the game after that. A deal is made, that Bill gets whatever Charles wins over the $3,000 he needs to pay the money back. However, Gene passes out while waiting for the game to start, and when he wakes up he does not remember the deal he made and goes home to his wife. Bill discovers that Gene is gone, and Dutch finds out about Charles's planned escape, and tries to stop him. Nina convinces Bill to do the right thing and help fend off Dutch's men when they try to get Charles and the money back.

Bill is changed by his discovery that behaving honorably has a positive effect on him; he falls in love with Nina, who returns his feelings.

Cast
Douglas Fairbanks Jr. as Bill O'Brien
Rita Hayworth as Nina Barona
Thomas Mitchell as Gene Gibbons
John Qualen as Charles Engle
George Watts as Joseph Hopper
Ralph Theodore as Dutch Enright
Eddie Foster as Louie Artino
Jack Roper as Eddie Burns
Constance Worth as Sylvia Marbe

Reception
On review aggregator website Rotten Tomatoes, the film holds an approval rating of 67%, based on 6 reviews, with an average rating of 6/10.

Time Out called the film "[a] characteristically slick (if moralizing) script by Hecht and fine camerawork from Garmes can't quite prevent tedium setting in as the excellent cast play a group of moral down-and-outs (embezzler, con-man, dancer, disillusioned playwright) who see the light and discover that life is worth living during a night's gambling in a New York café".

Variety praised the film as "synthetic tale of Broadway nightlife", adding that "[a]side from Thomas Mitchell, as a screwball playwright who sees a story in every individual, and who delights in plotting a finish, there's nothing much in the Hechtian tale".

Gil Jawetz of DVD Talk criticized the price for a film, since it was never restored for DVD viewing experience.

References

External links

1940 drama films
American drama films
American black-and-white films
Films about con artists
Films directed by Ben Hecht
Films scored by George Antheil
Films about gambling
Films with screenplays by Ben Hecht
Columbia Pictures films
1940s American films